Reflectativity is the second album by American jazz trumpeter Wadada Leo Smith and the debut with the ensemble New Dalta Ahkri, which was recorded live at  The Educational Center for the Arts, New Haven, and released in 1975 on his own Kabell label.

Background
At this time, Smith was living in New Haven and he formed the band with his students and other young musicians based in the area. For this performance it was a trio with pianist Anthony Davis and bassist Wes Brown. In 2000, Smith released an extended remake with Brown replaced by Malachi Favors on John Zorn's imprint Tzadik. The original album was reissued in 2004 including the second set of the concert as part of the four-CD box Kabell Years: 1971-1979, also on Tzadik.

Reception

In his review for AllMusic, Eugene Chadbourne states "Well beyond the structural clichés of normal 'head-solo-head-and out' jazz, this piece is one of the finest combinations of improvisation and composition ever recorded."

Track listing
All compositions by Wadada Leo Smith.
 "Reflectativity" - 22:24 
 "t wmukl - D" - 18:47

Personnel
Wadada Leo Smith - trumpet, flugelhorn, Indian flute, atenteben, percussion
Anthony Davis - piano
 Wes Brown - bass, atenteben

References

1975 live albums
Wadada Leo Smith live albums